Hans Martin or Hans-Martin may refer to:

People with the personal name
Hans Martin (cyclist), Swiss cyclist
Hans Martin (singer), Swedish-Finnish singer

People with the given name
Hans Martin Gulbrandsen (1914-1979), Norwegian sprint canoer
Hans Martin Hanssen (1911–1971), Norwegian politician 
Hans-Martin Linde (born 1930), German flute and recorder player
Hans Martin Pippart (1888-1918), German pioneer aircraft manufacturer and early pilot
Hans-Martin Sass (born 1935), German bioethicist
Hans Martin Seip (born 1937), Norwegian chemist
Hans Martin Sutermeister (1907-1977), Swiss physician and medical writer, politician, and activist (pen name Hans Moehrlen)
Hans-Martin Tillack, (born 1961), German reporter
Hans-Martin Trepp (1922-1970), Swiss ice hockey player

Other uses
Hans-Martin Nunatak, an isolated nunatak in Queen Maud Land, Antarctica